Gregory or Greg Hughes is the name of multiple people, notably:

 Gregory Hughes (athlete) (born 1979), triple jumper from Barbados
 Gregory Hughes (writer), British writer
 Greg Hughes, American politician from Utah
 Greg Hughes (1939-2014), Irish Gaelic footballer

See also 
 Gregg Hughes (born 1963), American talk radio broadcaster